Günyurdu is a village in Tarsus  district of Mersin Province, Turkey. At    it is situated in Çukurova (Cilicia of the antiquity) plains between Çukurova motorway and state road . It is one of the easternmost villages of the province. The population of Günyurdu was 2174  as of 2012.

References

Villages in Tarsus District